Black River is a  river in the southwest part of the U.S. state of Michigan that empties into Lake Michigan in South Haven at , where it discharges past the South Pier Lighthouse. The river takes its name from the dark brown color of its water, which is caused by suspended sediments and organic materials picked up along its course. The river supports a variety of wildlife including trout, snapping turtles, leeches, and many other varieties of flora and fauna.

The North Branch Black River is formed out of the Black River Drain, which rises out of a complex of drains including the Leverich Drain and North State Road Drain in Clyde Township and Ganges Township in Allegan County.

About three miles above its mouth on Lake Michigan, the river forks, with the South Branch draining Van Buren County. Less than three miles further upstream, the river forks again into the Middle and North Branches. The Middle branch drains areas of both Van Buren and Allegan counties, and the North Branch watershed is entirely in Allegan County.

Tributaries 
From the mouth:
 (right) South Branch Black River
 (left) Butternut Creek
 (left) Tripp and Extension Drain
 (right) Cedar Creek
 (left) Eastman Creek
 (left) Picture Lake
 (right) Moon Lake
 (right) Merriman Lake
 School Section Lake
 Maple Creek
 (left) Cedar Drain
 (right) Nelson Extension Drain
 Great Bear Lake Drain
 Great Bear Lake
 Haven and Max Lake Drain
 Max Lake
 Mill Lake
 Munn Lake
 (left) Lower Jeptha Lake Drain
 Lower Jeptha Lake
 Upper Jeptha Lake
 (right) Black River Extension Drain
 (left) South Scott Lake
 (right) Abernathy Lake
 (left) Max Lake
 (left) North Scott Lake
 Middle Branch Black River
 (right) Spicebush Creek
 (left) Scott Creek Drain, also known as Scott Creek
 (left) Elm Creek Drain, also known as Elm Creek
 Lower Scott Lake
 Upper Scott Lake
 Barber Creek, also spelled Barbor Creek
 (right) Lester Lake
 (right) Mud Lake
 (right) Coffee Lake
 Saddle Lake
 Spring Brook
 Spring Brook Lake
 (left) Osterhout Lake
 (left) Melvin Creek
 Deer Lake
 Lake Moriah
 (left) Mud Lake
 (right) Little Bear Lake Drain
 (left) Lake Eleven
 Lake Fourteen
 North Branch Black River
 Black River Drain
 (right) Ockford Drain
 (left) Beaver Dam Drain
 (left) North State Road Drain
 Hutchins Lake
 Leverich Drain

References

External links
Black River Watershed Project
Black River Watershed Management Plan
Southwest Michigan Planning Commission
Two Rivers Coalition

Rivers of Michigan
Rivers of Allegan County, Michigan
Rivers of Van Buren County, Michigan
Tributaries of Lake Michigan